Brett Kulak (born January 6, 1994) is a Canadian professional ice hockey defenceman currently playing for the Edmonton Oilers of the National Hockey League (NHL). Kulak was selected by the Calgary Flames in the fourth round, 105th overall, of the 2012 NHL Entry Draft. He played junior hockey for the Vancouver Giants of the Western Hockey League (WHL).

Playing career

Junior
He was drafted 197th overall in the WHL Bantam Draft by the Vancouver Giants and played four seasons of junior hockey in the Western Hockey League (WHL) between 2010 and 2014. In 216 games with the Giants, he scored 35 goals and added 93 assists. The Calgary Flames selected Kulak with their fourth round pick, 105th overall, at the 2012 NHL Entry Draft.  Following the conclusion of his WHL seasons in both 2012–13 and 2013–14, Kulak joined the Flames' American Hockey League (AHL) affiliate, the Abbotsford Heat, on amateur try-out agreements; he played four and six games in each respective season.

Professional
On March 18, 2014, the Flames signed Kulak to a three-year, entry-level contract. He began the 2014–15 season with the ECHL's Colorado Eagles before earning a promotion to the AHL's Adirondack Flames. Kulak was then recalled to Calgary and made his NHL debut on April 11, 2015, in the Flames' final regular season game, a 5–1 loss to the Winnipeg Jets.

On October 18, 2016, against the Buffalo Sabres, Kulak recorded his first career point, assisting on Michael Frolík's first period goal. The Flames won the game 4-3. Kulak finished the 2016–17 season with 3 assists in 21 games.

On August 28, 2017, the Flames re-signed Kulak (who was a restricted free agent) to a one-year, two-way contract worth $650,000.

On October 1, 2018, the Flames traded Kulak to the Montreal Canadiens in exchange for Matt Taormina and Rinat Valiev. Kulak was subsequently assigned to the Canadiens' AHL affiliate, the Laval Rocket. On November 22, he was called up by the Canadiens after an injury to defenseman Noah Juulsen. He was immediately put into the line-up. A few games later, star defenseman Shea Weber was activated from injury reserve and the Canadiens sacrificed veteran defenseman Karl Alzner before Kulak by putting him on waivers. On December 29, 2018, Kulak scored his first goal for Montreal in a 5-6 defeat to the Tampa Bay Lightning. He scored his first game-winning goal in a 3-0 victory over the Colorado Avalanche on January 12, 2019.

On May 25, 2019, the Canadiens signed Kulak to a three-year, $5.55 million contract extension with an annual average of $1.85 million. Over the following seasons, Kulak typically played on the team's third pairing, notably participating in the Canadiens' deep run to the 2021 Stanley Cup Final. In the final season of his contract, Kulak assumed an increasingly important role in the team's defence group, as a result of departures and injuries to other key players. With the Canadiens entering a period of team restructuring under the new management of Jeff Gorton and Kent Hughes there was some speculation as to whether the team would seek to re-sign Kulak or explore trading him. On March 19, 2022, he played what would prove to be his final game as a Canadiens, scoring a goal in a 5–1 rout of the Ottawa Senators. In advance of the March 21 trade deadline Kulak was dealt to the Edmonton Oilers.

Kulak registered 2 goals and 6 assists in 18 regular season games with the Oilers to close out the 2021–22 season, before the team entered the 2022 Stanley Cup playoffs. Kulak's contributions were well-received on the team, and he played primarily as a pair with defenceman Tyson Barrie, credited with boosting Barrie's effectiveness. Kulak missed the morning practice the day of the pivotal Game 7 in the Oilers' first round matchup with the Los Angeles Kings, as he was attending the birth of his daughter, but was able to participate in the game itself that saw the Oilers advance to the second round against the Calgary Flames. The Oilers reached the Western Conference Final, losing to the Colorado Avalanche in four games. Following the end of the season, Kulak signed a new four-year, $11 million contract with the Oilers.

Personal life
Kulak grew up on a farm near Stony Plain, Alberta, with his parents Gil and Laura and older brothers Tyson and Kyle, playing with the Stony Plain and Spruce Grove Minor Hockey Association.

His first child was born on May 13, 2022.

Career statistics

Awards and honours

References

External links

1994 births
Living people
Abbotsford Heat players
Adirondack Flames players
Calgary Flames draft picks
Calgary Flames players
Canadian expatriate ice hockey players in the United States
Canadian ice hockey defencemen
Colorado Eagles players
Edmonton Oilers players
Ice hockey people from Alberta
Laval Rocket players
Montreal Canadiens players
People from Parkland County
Stockton Heat players
Vancouver Giants players